Orthaga rudis is a species of snout moth in the genus Orthaga. It was described by Francis Walker in 1862. It is found in India.

References

Moths described in 1862
Epipaschiinae
Endemic fauna of India